This page lists public opinion polls for the 2014 Ukrainian presidential election.

First round

Poll results are listed in the table below in reverse chronological order, showing the most recent first. The highest percentage figure in each polling survey is displayed in bold, and the background shaded in the two leading candidates respective colours. In the instance that there is a tie, then no figure is bolded. If no candidate obtains an absolute majority in the first round, then the two highest polling candidates will contest a run-off second ballot. 
The lead column on the right shows the percentage-point difference between the two candidates with the highest figures. Poll results use the date the survey's fieldwork was done, as opposed to the date of publication. However, if such date is unknown, the date of publication will be given instead.

Before the Yanukovych ouster and Crimean crisis 

Notes

References

Ukraine
2014 elections in Ukraine
2014
Presidential elections in Ukraine